The Dalecarlia Tunnel in Brookmont, Maryland, near Washington, D.C. is a former railroad tunnel that presently carries the Capital Crescent Trail underneath MacArthur Boulevard and the Washington Aqueduct.

It was built in 1910 as part of the Georgetown Branch of the Baltimore and Ohio Railroad. It features decorative brick facings on both ends and is lined with brick throughout its length.

CSX Transportation, the successor to the B&O Railroad, ceased train operations through the tunnel in 1985 and officially abandoned the rail line in 1986.

See also
Metropolitan Subdivision

References

External links
The Georgetown Branch - History and photos
Capital Crescent Trail

Brookmont, Maryland
Railroad tunnels in Maryland
Baltimore and Ohio Railroad tunnels
Rail trails in Maryland
Transportation buildings and structures in Montgomery County, Maryland
Protected areas of Montgomery County, Maryland
Tunnels completed in 1910
1910 establishments in Maryland